Xiphasia is a small genus of combtooth blennies found in the Pacific and Indian Oceans.

Species
The currently recognized species in this genus are:
 Xiphasia matsubarai Okada & K. Suzuki, 1952 (Japanese snake blenny)
 Xiphasia setifer Swainson, 1839 (hairtail blenny)

References

 
Blenniinae